MDMB-CHMINACA (also known as MDMB(N)-CHM) is an indazole-based synthetic cannabinoid that acts as a potent agonist of the CB1 receptor, and has been sold online as a designer drug. It was invented by Pfizer in 2008, and is one of the most potent cannabinoid agonists known, with a binding affinity of 0.0944 nM at CB1, and an EC50 of 0.330 nM. It is closely related to MDMB-FUBINACA, which caused at least 1000 hospitalizations and 40 deaths in Russia as consequence of intoxication.

Legal status
MDMB-CHMINACA is a Fifth Schedule of the Misuse of Drugs Act (MDA) controlled substance in Singapore as of May 2015.

MDMB-CHMINACA is illegal in Germany, Switzerland as of December 2015.

Sweden's public health agency suggested classifying MDMB-CHMINACA as a hazardous substance, on September 25, 2019.

See also 

 AB-CHMINACA
 ADB-CHMINACA
 ADB-FUBINACA
 MDMB-CHMICA
 MDMB-FUBINACA
 PX-3 (APP-CHMINACA)

References 

Cannabinoids
Designer drugs
Indazolecarboxamides